John Blair (1910 – 1975) was a Scottish footballer, who played as a centre-half for Motherwell and Scotland.

Blair played a few games for the Motherwell team that won the Scottish league championship in 1931–32 and he played in two Scottish Cup Finals (a defeat to Celtic in 1933, and a loss to Clyde in 1939). He also represented the Scottish League twice.

In early November 1945, the Clapton Orient programme reported that Blair would be joining the O's as both a player and coach. He made four wartime appearances for Orient.

His nephew Charlie Cox was also a footballer, and also won silverware with Motherwell.

References

1910 births
1970s deaths
Footballers from Glasgow
Scottish footballers
Association football central defenders
Motherwell F.C. players
Scottish Football League players
Scottish Football League representative players
Scotland international footballers
Date of birth missing
Date of death missing
Yoker Athletic F.C. players
Clapton Orient F.C. wartime guest players
Scottish Junior Football Association players
Greenock Morton F.C. wartime guest players